Chauncey H. Griffith (1879–1956) was an American printer and typeface designer. 

Griffith was born in a small town near Ironton, Ohio, and began his career as a compositor and pressman in Lexington, Kentucky, where his family moved when he was ten years old. In 1906 he joined the Mergenthaler Linotype Company as part of their New Orleans sales force. In 1915, he transferred to the company's New York division, where he worked as assistant to the president and oversaw the entrenchment of Linotype equipment as the industry standard in newspaper and book composition. In 1936, he was elected the Vice President of Typographic Development.  

Griffith worked closely with the designers William Addison Dwiggins and Rudolph Ruzicka, whom he solicited to create typefaces for Mergenthaler. He developed the typeface Excelsior in 1931 and it was widely adopted as a text and display face for newspapers across the United States. While Griffith was head of typographic development, Linotype issued revivals of Baskerville, Granjon, and Janson. In 1938, Griffith designed the typeface Bell Gothic for the Bell Telephone Company's directories. 

Griffith's typeface designs include:

Ionic No. 5, 1922–1925 - part of Linotype's Legibility Group of newspaper faces, also including:
Excelsior 1931
Paragon 1935
Opticon 1935–1936
Poster Bodoni, Poster Bodoni Compressed, 1929
Granjon, 1930
 Memphis Extra Bold, Extra Bold Italic, 1936
Bookman, 1936
Janson, 1937
Bell Gothic, 1938
 Ryerson Condensed, 1940
Corona, 1941
Monticello, 1946

References 

 Jaspert, W. Pincus, W. Turner Berry and A.F. Johnson. The Encyclopædia of Type Faces. Blandford Press Ltd.: 1953, 1983. .

Fiedl, Frederich, Nicholas Ott and Bernard Stein. Typography: An Encyclopedic Survey of Type Design and Techniques Through History. Black Dog & Leventhal: 1998. .
Macmillan, Neil. An A–Z of Type Designers. Yale University Press: 2006. .

External links
Guide to the Chauncey Hawley Griffith papers, housed at the University of Kentucky Libraries Special Collections Research Center
Guide to the Chauncey Hawley Griffith photographs, housed at the University of Kentucky Libraries Special Collections Research Center
Linotype's web page on Griffith
The Typophile page on Griffith

American typographers and type designers
1879 births
1956 deaths
American printers